Tunnelville is an unincorporated community in the counties of Richland and Vernon in the U.S. state of Wisconsin. The portion in Richland County is located in the town of Forest, and the portion in Vernon County is located in the town of Stark.

Notes

Unincorporated communities in Richland County, Wisconsin
Unincorporated communities in Vernon County, Wisconsin
Unincorporated communities in Wisconsin